Charles Edward Orr (21 November 1866 – 6 April 1935) was a Scotland international rugby union player.

Rugby Union career

Amateur career

He played for West of Scotland.

Provincial career

He was capped by Glasgow District to play Edinburgh District in the inter-city fixture of 5 December 1885. He played for Glasgow again in their match against North of Scotland District on 2 January 1886.

He was capped by the West of Scotland District to play the East of Scotland District on 29 January 1877. He scored a try for the West district.

International career

Family

He was the brother of Jack Orr who was also capped for Scotland.

References

Sources

 Bath, Richard (ed.) The Scotland Rugby Miscellany (Vision Sports Publishing Ltd, 2007 )

1866 births
1935 deaths
Scottish rugby union players
Scotland international rugby union players
Rugby union players from East Renfrewshire
West of Scotland FC players
West of Scotland District (rugby union) players
Glasgow District (rugby union) players